57 Aquilae (abbreviated 57 Aql) is a double star in the constellation of Aquila. 57 Aquilae is its Flamsteed designation. The primary star has an apparent visual magnitude of 5.70, while the secondary is magnitude 6.48. The pair have an angular separation of 35.624 arcseconds and probably form a wide binary star system. However, the margin of errors for their respective distance estimates overlap, indicating a probability that they are actually located much closer to each other. Both stars are massive, B-type main sequence stars with rapid rotation rates.

References

External links
 CCDM J19546-0814
 HR7593
 Image 57 Aquilae

188293
Binary stars
Aquila (constellation)
Double stars
B-type main-sequence stars
Aquilae, 57
097966
Durchmusterung objects
7593 4